Morons from Outer Space is a 1985 British comedy-science fiction film directed by Mike Hodges and written by and starring Griff Rhys Jones and Mel Smith. It also stars Joanne Pearce, Jimmy Nail and James B. Sikking.

Plot
The story begins on a small spaceship docking with a refuelling station. On board are a group of four aliens called Bernard, Sandra, Desmond, and Julian. During a particularly tedious period of their stay at the station, the other three begin playing with the ship's controls while Bernard is outside playing spaceball. They accidentally disconnect his part of the ship, leaving him stranded while they crash into a large blue planet close by (Earth).

The aliens become instant celebrities on arrival, despite being able to bring no great revelation or technical ability to the people of Earth (as is central to the plot of many "aliens on Earth" films). They find a manager (Jones) and become wealthy more or less overnight, packing fans in auditoriums just to see them. Meanwhile, Bernard arrives on Earth via other means of transport. Despite being by far the most intelligent of the group, Bernard is not afforded any celebrity, and is in fact condemned to vagrancy and a brief stint in a mental hospital before reuniting with his fellow travellers near the end of the film. The others, fearing that the introduction of Bernard would lessen their popularity and celebrity, fail to mention that they had originally been travelling with a fourth.

Cast
 Joanne Pearce as Sandra Brock the alien
 Jimmy Nail as Desmond Brock the alien
 Paul Bown as Julian Tope the alien
 James Sikking as Col. Raymond Laribee - CIA
 Dinsdale Landen as Commander Grenville Matteson
 Tristram Jellinek as Simpson
 George Innes as Stanley Benson
 Mel Smith as Bernard the left behind alien
 Griff Rhys Jones as Graham Sweetley
 Mark Lewis Jones as Godfrey
 Leonard Fenton as Commissionaire
 Andre Maranne as Prof. Trousseau
 Leslie Grantham as motorway policeman

Production
The film was announced in November 1983. It was part of the initial slate of four films from Thorn EMI's new chairman, Verity Lambert, the others being Slayground, Dreamchild and Comfort and Joy. It was written by Mel Smith and Griff Rhys Jones and directed by Mike Hodges. Lambert offered the film to Mike Hodges, who agreed if EMI would make a script of his, Mid-Atlantic, and signed a two-picture deal.
 
In December 1984, Thorn EMI offered investors the chance to invest in several films by issuing £36 million worth of shares. The films were A Passage to India (1984), Illegal Aliens, Dreamchild, Wild Geese II and The Holcroft Covenant. Illegal Aliens later became entitled Morons from Outer Space.

The release of the film caused Mel Brooks to re-title a film he was working on from Planet Moron to Spaceballs.

Reception

Critical

The film has received generally negative reviews, and holds a rating of 4.5 out of 10 on IMDb.

The Observer called the film "so embarrassingly unfunny I often felt like crawling under my seat."

Empire criticized its "loose script whose weaknesses are all the more glaring for the film's inability to exploit the power of absurdity."

Mike Hodges disliked the film, regarding it as a "misfire". He clashed with Smith and Jones in post production, an article claiming "they did not trust, or perhaps understand his comedic judgement or cinematic visual satire and the film became far more broad than he had intended."  However, he did enjoy satirising the sentimental "Spielbergian vision of the world".

Box office
The film performed moderately at the box office in the UK and only earned $17,000 in the US.

References

External links
 
 
 
 
 filmcritic.com review
 DVD Talk review
 Empire Magazine review
 SF, Horror and Fantasy Film Review  review
 Time Out review

1985 films
1985 independent films
1980s science fiction comedy films
1980s English-language films
Films directed by Mike Hodges
British independent films
British science fiction comedy films
Films shot at Pinewood Studios
EMI Films films
Films about extraterrestrial life
1980s British films